Anthony Crispo (or Antonio;  - 1494), became Lord of Syros in 1463 after his older brother Francesco's death. He was the youngest son of Nicholas Crispo, Lord of Syros, and brother of Francesco II, sixteenth Duke of the Archipelago.

He married ... de Paterno, without issue.

References

15th-century births
1494 deaths
Antonio 01
People from the Cyclades
Year of birth uncertain
Lords of Syros